Cetățeni is a commune in Argeș County, Muntenia, Romania. It is composed of three villages: Cetățeni, Lăicăi, and Valea Cetățuia.

The neighboring communes are: Stoenești to the north,  Pucheni to the east, Malu cu Flori to the south, Văleni to the west, and Mioarele to the northwest.

 is located here.

References

Communes in Argeș County
Localities in Muntenia